The Ambassador of Malaysia to the Republic of Kazakhstan is the head of Malaysia's diplomatic mission to Kazakhstan. The position has the rank and status of an Ambassador Extraordinary and Plenipotentiary and is based in the Embassy of Malaysia, Astana.

List of heads of mission

Chargés d'Affaires to Kazakhstan

Ambassadors to Kazakhstan

See also
 Kazakhstan–Malaysia relations

References 

 
Kazakhstan
Malaysia